The Royal Army of Oman (Arabic: الجيش العماني, transliterated: al-Jaīsh al-'Umānī) is the ground forces component of the Sultan of Oman's Armed Forces. It was founded in 1907 as the Muscat Garrison. It has a current strength of 35,000 personnel.

History
Oman has a military history which dates back to the seventh century, when troops from the Alozd tribe were strong enough to help Abu Bakr, companion of the Islamic prophet Mohammed. At the beginning of the seventeenth century there were local forces associated with Ya'ariba dynasty. It was this dynasty, which forced the expulsion of Portuguese from the country in 1650. The Ya'ariba dynasty were responsible for most of the fortified site across what is now the Sultanate of Oman from Musandam in the north to the southern province of Dhofar.

The Royal Army of Oman officially traces its origins back to the formation of the Muscat Garrison in 1907, this local garrison force was developed and became the Muscat Infantry in 1921. An agreement between the Omani and the British governments in 1958 led to the creation of the Sultan's Armed Forces (SAF) and the creation of formally structured Omani army units. At the same time the United Kingdom promised to provide direct assistance in the development of the SAF and its land forces. During the 1960 and 1970s, army units fought in the Dhofar Rebellion alongside British units and it relied on embedded unit-level British military advisors, who saw combat alongside the units they were very much part of. At the end of the Dhofar Rebellion the Omani army became an independent service known as the Sultan of Oman Land Forces in 1976. In 1990, Sultan Qaboos bin Said al Said renamed his land forces the Royal Army of Oman (RAO). The RAO frequently exercises with the armed forces of fellow Gulf Cooperation Council nations and other strategic defense partners such as the US and UK.

Ground Forces Organisation
According to the latest MoD Telephone Directory published by Omantel, RAO is structured as follows: 

HQ RAO at Muaskar al Murtafa'a (MAM) near Seeb
Two infantry brigades:
11 Brigade (the southern brigade) based in Salalah
23 Brigade (the northern brigade) based at MAM
The Sultan's Armour Units (MSO) based at Sultan bin Safy Camp at Shafa, near Izki 
Two regiments of main battle tanks (Challenger 2 and M60A3)
Medium Reconnaissance Regiment (FV101 Scorpion)
The Border Guard Brigade with a base in Haima in the Al Wusta Governate
Infantry
Muscat Regiment (MR) based at Bidbid - Mowag Piranha-equipped Mechanised Infantry
Northern Frontier Regiment (NFR) based at Ibri and Buraimi
Desert Regiment (DR) based at Ibra - Mowag Piranha-equipped Mechanised Infantry
Jebel Regiment (JR) based at Nizwa
Southern Regiment (KJ) one battalion based at Salalah near the Royal Palace on the Taqah Road 
Western Frontier Regiment (WFR) based at Thumrait 
Sultan of Oman's Parachute Regiment (SOPR) based at Rustaq
Oman Reconnaissance Regiment based in Dhofar
Border and Local Security Forces (light infantry role)
Western Border Security Force based at Al Qabil
Coastal Security Force based at Sur
Musandam Security Force (MSF) based at Bukha
Rural Security Forces based in Salalah (replaced Firqat Forces)
Sultan of Oman's Artillery
Northern artillery units based at Izki
Southern artillery units based at Thumrait in Dhofar
SAF Signals based in MAM (with units supporting 11 Brigade)
SAF Engineers based in MAM (with units supporting 11 Brigade)
SAF Transport based in Mabela (with units supporting 11 Brigade)
SAF Electrical & Mechanical Engineers based in MAM (with units supporting 11 Brigade)
SAF Ordnance based in MAM (with units supporting 11 Brigade)
SAF Medical Services main hospitals at Al Khoudh (north) and Umm al Ghawarif (south) and other base locations
Training Establishments
National Defence College Bayt al Falaj, Ruwi, Muscat
Military Technical College near Seeb Airport
Sultan Qaboos Military College (KSQA) including the RAO Officer Training School based at Aydem in Dhofar
Sultan Armed Forces Training Regiment
Battle Training Centre - Saiq, Jebel al Akhdhar

Garrison locations
Based on locational evidence given in Omantel telephone directory listings (telephone number associations), historical recollections of British servicemen and analysis of Google Earth and Google Map imagery and cartographic data the following RAO garrisons have been identified:

Equipment
 

In 2020 Oman spent 11% of GDP on military expenditures.

Oman has one armored brigade (MSO) equipped with the Challenger 2 and the M60A1 and M60A3 Patton tanks.

Between 2001 and 2004 Oman received 174 amphibious light armored vehicles and more than 80 armored VBL from France.

In May 2013 the United States announced a deal with Oman valued at $2.1 billion to supply a ground-based air defense system.

172 FNSS Pars armoured combat vehicle ordered for delivery from 2017, total cost $500m

Oman looks to acquire K2 main battle tanks from South Korea. South Korean Defense Company Hyundai Rotem Co. could sell 76 K2 Black Panther Main Battle Tanks to Oman, a deal that could reach an amount up to $884.6 million.

Armoured vehicles

Trucks
 MAN TGA heavy trucks 
 ACMAT VLRA 6x6 
 ACMAT VLRA 4x4 
 Land Rover 4x4

Field artillery
Type-90A 122mm MRLs (12)
G6 howitzers (24)
M109A2 howitzers (15) - status unknown
L118 light guns (39)
M-46 130mm guns (15)
Type 59-1 130mm guns (12)
FH70 155mm howitzers (12)
122 mm howitzer 2A18 (D-30) (30)
L16 81mm Mortars
M102 105mm howitzers (36)
Brandt 120mm mortars (12)
2R2M 120mm (SP on VAB) mortar (14)
M30 107mm mortars (SP on M-106A-2 APCs) (12)
BGM-71A/C improved TOW ATGMs (26 launchers, 220 missiles)
BGM-71F TOW-2B ATGMs (18 launchers, 562 missiles)
FGM-148 anti-tank guided missiles (30 launchers, 250 missiles)
MILAN anti-tank guided missiles (32-50 launchers)
LAW 80 light ATRLs
RPG-7V light ATRLs

Air defense
Oerlikon 35 mm twin cannon  GDF-007 (10)
Skyguard-AD system (Aspide SAMs+Oerlikon GDF-002 35mm twin AAGs)
Bofors 40mm gun
VDAA 2x20mm SP-AAGs (9)
ZU-23 2x23mm AAGs (4-5)
M-167A2 VADS 20mm AAG
SHORAR radar system (2) - associated with Mistral SAM
Blindfire radar systems for Rapier missiles (18)
Skyguard-radar systems for Skyguard A\D systems (5)
Cymbeline artillery location radar (3)
Crotale NG SAM
Avenger SP-air defense system-on order (18)
Rapier MK-2\Jernas SAMs (5) launchers\600 Rapier-1+ 800 Rapier-2 missiles.
Mistral anti-aircraft missile (54) launchers\230 missiles.
Blowpipe MANPADs-200 missiles.
Javelin MANPADs (30) launchers\280 missiles.
SA-7 Grail MANPADs (34)
NASAMS
BAMSE
THAAD anti-missile system

Small arms

References

Oman
Military of Oman